Ibrahim Bobson Kamara (born 22 September 1975) is a Sierra Leonean footballer. He played in eight matches for the Sierra Leone national football team from 1995 to 2001. He was also named in Sierra Leone's squad for the 1996 African Cup of Nations tournament.

References

1975 births
Living people
Sierra Leonean footballers
Sierra Leone international footballers
1996 African Cup of Nations players
Place of birth missing (living people)
Association footballers not categorized by position